Dichloro[1,3-bis(diphenylphosphino)propane]nickel a coordination complex with the formula NiCl2(dppp); where dppp is the diphosphine 1,3-bis(diphenylphosphino)propane. It is used as a catalyst in organic synthesis. The compound is a bright orange-red crystalline powder.

Structure and properties
While the electronic and solid-state structure of the chloride congener is not known (due to low solubility in common analytical solvents), several studies have been carried out on the bromo and iodo derivatives.  The complexes display a temperature-dependent interconversion between square-planar and tetrahedral geometries (diamagnetic and paramagnetic) in polar organic solvents (Keq between 1-3.68, depending on the solvent and temperature).  In contrast, dichloro(1,2-bis(diphenylphosphino)ethane)nickel adopts a static square-planar (diamagnetic) structure in solution.

Preparation 
NiCl2(dppp) is prepared by combining equal molar portions of nickel(II) chloride hexahydrate with 1,3-bis(diphenylphosphino)propane in 2-propanol.

Ni(H2O)6Cl2  +  dppp   →   NiCl2(dppp)  +  6 H2O

Reactions
NiCl2(dppp) in an effective catalyst for coupling reactions such as the Kumada coupling and Suzuki reactions (example below). It also catalyzes other reactions that convert enol ethers, dithioacetals, and vinyl sulfides to olefins.

References

Nickel complexes
Phosphine complexes
Chloro complexes